You Will Remember Me is a Canadian drama film, directed by Éric Tessier and released in 2020. Based on the theatrical play by François Archambault, the film stars Rémy Girard as Édouard Beauchemin, a successful academic who is beginning to suffer from the early stages of dementia.

The film's premiere, originally slated for March 20, 2020, was postponed due to the COVID-19 pandemic in Canada. The film instead premiered at the Sarajevo Film Festival in August 2020. It was selected as the opening film of the 2022 Abitibi-Témiscamingue International Film Festival, its first actual screening in Quebec due to the pandemic-related disruptions of film distribution.

Awards
The film was screened at the 2020 Whistler Film Festival, where Girard won the Borsos Competition award for Best Performance in a Canadian Film.

The film received two Canadian Screen Award nominations at the 10th Canadian Screen Awards in 2022, for Best Adapted Screenplay (Tessier) and Best Cinematography (Pierre Gill).

At Abitibi-Témiscamingue, the film was the winner of the Grand Prix Hydro-Québec.

References

External links

2020 films
Canadian drama films
2020s French-language films
Films set in Quebec
Films shot in Quebec
Films directed by Éric Tessier
Films based on Canadian plays
2020 drama films
French-language Canadian films
2020s Canadian films